This is a list of the Australia national under-23 soccer team results from 2020 to the present day.

2020s

2020

2021

2022

Notes

References

External links
 Olyroos (U23) Games

Australia national soccer team